South Olive is an unincorporated community in Noble County, in the U.S. state of Ohio.

History
South Olive was laid out in 1871 when the railroad was extended to that point.

References

Unincorporated communities in Noble County, Ohio
Unincorporated communities in Ohio